Marie Panayotopoulos-Cassiotou (born 29 July 1952 in Chios)
is a Greek politician and was a Member of the European Parliament (MEP) with the New Democracy from 2004 to 2009, (part of the European People's Party).
As a member of the European Parliament Mrs Panayotopoulos was vice-chair of the European Parliament's Committee on Petitions. She had a seat in its Committee on Employment and Social Affairs, its Committee on Women's Rights and Gender Equality and had a substitute seat for the Committee on Legal Affairs.

In 2008 she won the Parliament Magazine MEP Award in the category of Employment and Social Affairs.

Education
 1974: Graduate in Greek and French literature (Athens)
 1976: Graduate in Byzantine and modern Greek literature (Athens)
 1977: diplôme d'études approfondies (DEA - University of Paris I: Panthéon-Sorbonne)
 1982: Doctorate in History (Paris I, Panthéon-Sorbonne 1982), Diploma in History and Byzantine Culture (Bari)
 1983: Specialist in Education and Vocational Guidance (Lyon II)

Career

 1975: Assistant French teacher
 1980-1990 Language teacher in lower and upper secondary schools in Greece (1984-1990 in Germany)
 1990-1996: Educational and vocational guidance counsellor Germany
 1993-1994: Deputy educational coordinator for Western Europe (Greece)
 Teacher of modern Greek language and literature and Byzantine literature at the University of Bonn
 1996-1997: Lexicographic research (Bonn, Germany)
 1996-2003: Involved in compilation of Byzantine-Greek dictionary

Political 
 Member of Stuttgart (1984-1990) and Bonn (1990-2004) New Democracy Movement
 1998-2004: Representative of the Greek Confederation of Large Families in COFACE

Decorations
 1994: Order of Merit of the Federal Republic of Germany
 2008: The Parliament Magazine MEP Award  in the category of Employment and Social Affairs

See also
 2004 European Parliament election in Greece

References

External links
 

1952 births
Living people
University of Paris alumni
New Democracy (Greece) MEPs
MEPs for Greece 2004–2009
21st-century women MEPs for Greece
Recipients of the Order of Merit of the Federal Republic of Germany
Politicians from Chios